IACR may refer to:

International Association for Cryptologic Research
Institute of Arable Crops Research
Gandhi Institute of Advanced Computer & Research, a college in India